James Leroy Powers (born September 30, 1936) is a Canadian retired professional hockey player who played for the Vancouver Canucks, Los Angeles Blades, and Seattle Totems of the Western Hockey League, totalling 854 games in that league. He also played one season for the Providence Reds in the American Hockey League.

External links
 

1936 births
Living people
Canadian ice hockey left wingers
Seattle Totems (WHL) players
Vancouver Canucks (WHL) players